The Metro Manila Film Festival Award for Best Production Design is an award presented annually by the Metropolitan Manila Development Authority (MMDA) to recognize achievement in art direction in film. It was first awarded in 1976 at the 2nd Metro Manila Film Festival ceremony, to Augusto Buenaventura for Diligin mo ng Hamog ang Uhaw na Lupa. The category's original name was Best Art Direction but was changed to its current name in 1987. Currently, nominees and winners are determined by executive committees, headed by the Metropolitan Manila Development Authority Chairman and key members of the film industry.

Winners and nominees

1970s

1980s

1990s

2000s

2010s

2020s

Notes

References

External links
IMDB: Metro Manila Film Festival
Official website of the Metro Manila Film Festival

Production Design
Awards for best art direction